VIK Televizija or Vlasenički informativni kanal was a local Bosnian public cable television channel based in Vlasenica municipality. It was founded in 2005  and it was closed in 2013.

References

External links 
 Website of CRA BiH
 Official website of Vlasenica municipality

2005 establishments in Bosnia and Herzegovina
Television channels and stations established in 2005
Television stations in Bosnia and Herzegovina
Television channels and stations disestablished in 2013